Stenanthemum patens is a species of flowering plant in the family Rhamnaceae and is endemic to the inland of Western Australia. It is a small shrub with densely hairy young stems and a few spines, egg-shaped to broadly egg-shaped leaves with the narrower end towards the base, and densely hairy clusters of tube-shaped flowers.

Description
The tip of the leaves is curved downwards, both surfaces are hairy, and the lower surface is whitish.

Taxonomy and naming
Stenanthemum patens was first formally described in 2001 by Barbara Lynette Rye in the journal Nuytsia from specimens collected in 1981. The specific epithet (patens) means "open" or "outstretched", referring to the spreading branchlets of this species.

Distribution and habitat
This species grows in low shrubland on rocky hillsides, and is only known from a few locations north of Leonara in the Murchison bioregion of inland Western Australia.

Conservation status
Stenanthemum patens is listed as "Priority One" by the Government of Western Australia Department of Biodiversity, Conservation and Attractions, meaning that it is known from only one or a few locations which are potentially at risk.

References

patens
Rosales of Australia
Flora of Western Australia
Plants described in 2001
Taxa named by Barbara Lynette Rye